Seán Heuston Bridge is a cast-iron bridge spanning the River Liffey beside Heuston Station in Dublin, Ireland.  It was previously named King's Bridge and Sarsfield Bridge - and the bridge and adjacent train station are still commonly referred to by older Dubliners as "Kings Bridge"  and "Kings Bridge Station" respectively. Previously used for road traffic, the bridge now carries pedestrian and Luas (tram) traffic.

History

Origins
Originally designed by George Papworth to carry horsedrawn traffic, the foundation stone was laid on 12 December 1827. The iron castings for the bridge were produced at the Royal Phoenix Iron Works in nearby Parkgate Street. (The foundry which also produced the parapets for the upstream Lucan Bridge). Construction completed in 1828, and the bridge was opened with the name Kings Bridge to commemorate a visit by King George IV in 1821.

The bridge has an overall width of just under 9 meters.

Renamings

In 1923 the bridge was renamed as Sarsfield Bridge after Patrick Sarsfield (1655–1693), and in 1941 it was again renamed as the Seán Heuston Bridge for Seán Heuston (1891–1916), who was executed for his part in the 1916 Easter Rising.

Luas
After the Frank Sherwin Bridge was opened nearby in the 1980s, Seán Heuston Bridge was no longer used to carry road traffic. It was restored in 2003 and now carries Luas tram traffic on the red line.

References

External links
 

Bridges in Dublin (city)
Bridges completed in 1828